There will be a qualification held to determine the two qualifiers from the Caribbean and three from Central America who will join Canada, Mexico and the United States at the final tournament.

Tiebreakers
Per FIFA regulations the group tiebreakers for all qualifying tournaments will be:

goal difference in all group matches
greatest number of goals scored in all group matches
If two or more teams are equal on the basis of the above criteria, their rankings shall be determined as follows:
greater number of points obtained in all group matches between the teams concerned
goal difference resulting from the group matches between the teams concerned
greater number of goals scored in all group matches between the teams concerned
play-off match on neutral ground (with extra time and penalty kicks, if necessary)

Caribbean
On 17 May 2011 CONCACAF announced the groups for the Caribbean qualifying. The group winners will advance to the second round, where two of them will qualify for the final qualifying tournament.

First round

Group A
Suriname was host for Group A.

The Jamaica-Suriname match was abandoned in injury time with the score at 2–2 due to a pitch invasion and a brawl in which the Jamaican coach and players attacked officials and police; the result stands.

Group B
Dominica was host for Group B.

Group C
Cuba was host for Group C.

Group D
Saint Kitts and Nevis was host for Group D.

Second round
St Kitts and Nevis was host for the Second Round.

Central America
On 3 May 2011, the UNCAF announced the two groups that will fight for three spots for the 2012 CONCACAF Men's Pre-Olympic Tournament.

Group 1
Played from 13–17 September 2011 in El Salvador.

Group 2
Played from 21–25 September 2011 in Honduras.

Playoff

 Panama won 3–2 on aggregate.

References

External links
2012 CONCACAF Men's Olympic Qualification
Regulations of the Olympic Football Tournaments London 2012

Qual